Blood Duster may refer to:
Blood Duster, a deathgrind/sludge metal/stoner rock band from Melbourne, Australia
"Blood Duster", a song by John Zorn from the 1989 album Naked City
 Blood Duster (album)